Raphael Beck (born 6 March 1992) is a German badminton player. He started playing badminton at age 9, and joined the Germany national badminton team in 2011.

Achievements

European Games 
Men's doubles

Mixed doubles

BWF Grand Prix 
The BWF Grand Prix has two levels, the Grand Prix and Grand Prix Gold. It is a series of badminton tournaments sanctioned by the Badminton World Federation (BWF) since 2007.

Men's doubles

  BWF Grand Prix Gold tournament
  BWF Grand Prix tournament

BWF International Challenge/Series 
Men's doubles

  BWF International Challenge tournament
  BWF International Series tournament
  BWF Future Series tournament

References

External links 
 

1992 births
Living people
Sportspeople from Düsseldorf
German male badminton players
Badminton players at the 2015 European Games
European Games bronze medalists for Germany
European Games medalists in badminton